Borzymy may refer to the following places:
Borzymy, Masovian Voivodeship (east-central Poland)
Borzymy, Kolno County in Podlaskie Voivodeship (north-east Poland)
Borzymy, Siemiatycze County in Podlaskie Voivodeship (north-east Poland)
Borzymy, Warmian-Masurian Voivodeship (north Poland)